In mathematics, the Harish-Chandra isomorphism, introduced by ,
is an isomorphism of commutative rings constructed in the theory of Lie algebras. The isomorphism maps the center  of the universal enveloping algebra  of a reductive Lie algebra  to the elements  of the symmetric algebra  of a Cartan subalgebra  that are invariant under the Weyl group .

Introduction and setting 
Let  be a semisimple Lie algebra,  its Cartan subalgebra and  be two elements of the weight space (where  is the dual of ) and assume that a set of positive roots  have been fixed. Let  and  be highest weight modules with highest weights  and  respectively.

Central characters 

Statement of Harish-Chandra theorem

Explicit isomorphism

The first is a projection . For a choice of positive roots , defining 

as the corresponding positive nilpotent subalgebra and negative nilpotent subalgebra respectively, due to the Poincaré–Birkhoff–Witt theorem there is a decomposition

If  is central, then in fact 

This is related to the central characters by

The second map is the twist map . On  viewed as a subspace of  it is defined  with  the Weyl vector. 

Then  is the isomorphism. The reason this twist is introduced is that  is not actually Weyl-invariant, but it can be proven that the twisted character  is.

Applications 
The theorem has been used to obtain a simple Lie algebraic proof of Weyl's character formula for finite-dimensional irreducible representations.

Further, it is a necessary condition for the existence of a non-zero homomorphism of some highest weight modules (a homomorphism of such modules preserves central character). A simple consequence is that for Verma modules or generalized Verma modules  with highest weight , there exist only finitely many weights  for which a non-zero homomorphism   exists.

Fundamental invariants

H. S. M. Coxeter observed that  is isomorphic to a polynomial algebra in  variables (see Chevalley–Shephard–Todd theorem for a more general statement). Therefore, the center of the universal enveloping algebra of a simple Lie algebra is isomorphic to a polynomial algebra. The degrees of the generators of the algebra are the degrees of the fundamental invariants given in the following table.

Examples
 For , the Harish-Chandra isomorphism says  is isomorphic to a polynomial algebra of Weyl-invariant polynomials in two variables  (since the Cartan subalgebra is two-dimensional). Since the Weyl group acts by reflections, they are isometries and so the degree 2 polynomial  is Weyl-invariant. The contours of the degree 3 Weyl-invariant polynomial (for a particular choice of standard representation where one of the reflections is across the x-axis) are shown below.

 For all the Lie algebras in the classification, there is a fundamental invariant of degree 2, the quadratic Casimir. In the isomorphism, these correspond to a degree 2 polynomial on the CSA. Since the Weyl group acts by reflections on the CSA, they are isometries, so the degree 2 invariant polynomial is  where  is the dimension of the CSA , also known as the rank of the Lie algebra.

 For , the Cartan subalgebra is one-dimensional, and the Harish-Chandra isomorphism says  is isomorphic to the algebra of Weyl-invariant polynomials in a single variable .

Generalization to affine Lie algebras
The above result holds for reductive, and in particular semisimple Lie algebras. There is a generalization to affine Lie algebras shown by Feigin and Frenkel showing that an algebra known as the Feigin–Frenkel center is isomorphic to a W-algebra associated to the Langlands dual Lie algebra .

The Feigin–Frenkel center of an affine Lie algebra  is not exactly the center of the universal enveloping algebra .

where  is the affine vertex algebra at the critical level. Elements of this center are also known as singular vectors or Segal–Sugawara vectors.

The isomorphism in this case is an isomorphism between the Feigin–Frenkel center and the W-algebra constructed associated to the Langlands dual Lie algebra by Drinfeld–Sokolov reduction:

See also
 Translation functor
 Infinitesimal character

Notes

External resources 
Notes on the Harish-Chandra isomorphism

References

 (Contains an improved proof of Weyl's character formula.)

Representation theory of Lie algebras
Theorems in algebra